John G. Gard (born August 3, 1963) is an American lobbyist and former politician.  A Republican, he was the 75th Speaker of the Wisconsin State Assembly (2003–2007) and was a member of the Assembly for 19 years.  Gard also ran unsuccessfully for United States House of Representatives in Wisconsin's 8th congressional district in 2006 and 2008.

Early life and career
Gard was born in Milwaukee, but was raised on his family's dairy farm in rural Lena, Wisconsin.   He graduated from Lena High School and went on to earn his bachelor's degree in political science from University of Wisconsin–La Crosse in 1986.  Gard went to work as a legislative assistant to State Representative David Prosser Jr.

Political career
Just a year after going to work for Prosser, at age 23, Gard made his first attempt at elected office in a 1987 special election called to replace Richard P. Matty, who was being appointed to the administration of Governor Tommy Thompson.  He ran his campaign out of his parents' farm, assisted by the volunteer efforts of his parents and seven siblings.  In September, Gard prevailed in a crowded seven-person Republican primary, which included Marinette County district attorney Tim Duket and Marinette Mayor Harold Pierce.  During the 1987 campaign, Gard declared his opposition to pending legislation which would mandate seat belt use.  In the October special election, he narrowly defeated Democrat Charles J. Boyle.

Gard was sworn in on October 12, 1987, at Lena High School.  The location was intended to accommodate his ailing grandfather, who could not travel to Madison.  Gard's grandfather died, however, on the morning of the swearing-in ceremony.  At the time of his swearing-in, Gard was the youngest member of the Wisconsin Legislature.

In 1990, Gard faced his closest election, surviving by a margin of just 45 votes after a recount.  Following the 1990 election, state redistricting removed Gard from the 88th district and placed him in the 89th district.  After redistricting, Gard easily won a rematch with his 1990 opponent, Scott McCormick, and subsequently won reelection to six more terms representing the 89th Assembly district.

Following the indictment of Scott Jensen in Fall 2002, the Assembly Republican caucus elected Gard the next Speaker of the Wisconsin State Assembly.  He served as speaker for the 96th and 97th Wisconsin Legislatures.

2006 Congressional race

In 2006, Wisconsin Congressman Mark Green announced he would run for Governor of Wisconsin, creating a vacancy in the 8th congressional district.  Gard chose to forego reelection to the Assembly enter the race to replace Green in the United States House of Representatives.  In the September primary, he defeated State Representative Terri McCormick with nearly 70% of the vote.

In the general election, Gard faced Democrat Steve Kagen, a medical doctor from Appleton, in what became the most expensive congressional race in Wisconsin history up to that point.  The district was considered a slightly Republican-leaning toss-up by pollsters and ratings organizations like The Cook Political Report.  The 2006 elections were driven by national issues like the Iraq War, healthcare, immigration, and earmark spending, and resulted in a Democratic wave, repudiating four years of Republican control of Washington, D.C.  Gard was able to carry his home county of Marinette with 51.4% of the vote and neighboring Oconto County, where he grew up, by 52.1%. He lost Brown County, home to Green Bay, by less than 1,000 votes (less than 1%). Kagen carried his home county of Outagamie with 54.5% of the vote.  The cumulative result was a narrow victory for Kagen, taking 50.9% of the general election vote.

2008 Congressional race

John Gard announced on Sunday April 27, 2008 that he would again run against Democratic incumbent Steve Kagen for 8th district representative. The Cook Political Report claimed the race 'leans Democrat' even though the district was considered to "lean-Republican" with a Cook Partisan Voting Index (PVI) of R +4.

Other GOP potential candidates dropped out of the race, including State Assemblymen Frank Lasee and Steve Wieckert, and former Green Bay Mayor Paul Jadin. Gard received the Republican nomination, but lost the election by a count of 164,561 to 193,261.

Later years
Since leaving office, Gard has operated as a lobbyist to the state government.  He and his wife co-own the Gard Business Group, through which they provide their lobbying services.  Among other clients, Gard has lobbied on behalf of Amazon.com and Google in the 2017, 2019, and 2021 sessions of the Wisconsin Legislature.

In the 2010 Wisconsin gubernatorial election, Gard supported former Representative Mark Neumann, serving as a co-chair of his campaign.

Gard was also influential on behalf of Mike Gallagher in the 2016 Republican primary for the 8th congressional district.  Gard was an outspoken surrogate for Gallagher and worked to raise funds for his campaign; he described Gallagher as a close family friend and likened him to a "young Paul Ryan."

In 2020, in an emotional op-ed, Gard inserted himself into the debate over athletes kneeling as a form of silent protest against racism.  Recalling the debate over state funding for Lambeau Field renovations in 2000, Gard asserted that the Green Bay Packers were disrespecting their community and ruining the franchise for fans like him.

Personal life and family
Gard is one of 8 children born to Herbert and Dixie Gard.  In 1990, he married fellow state representative Cathy Zeuske.  Zeuske was also elected to the Assembly in her early 20s and would later go on to serve as the 31st State Treasurer of Wisconsin and 9th Secretary of the Wisconsin Department of Revenue.  They have two adult children and reside in Suamico, Wisconsin.

Electoral history

Wisconsin Assembly, 88th district (1987–1990)

Wisconsin Assembly, 89th district (1992–2004)

U.S. House of Representatives (2006)

| colspan="6" style="text-align:center;background-color: #e9e9e9;"| Republican Primary, September 12, 2006

| colspan="6" style="text-align:center;background-color: #e9e9e9;"| General Election, November 7, 2006

U.S. House of Representatives (2008)

| colspan="6" style="text-align:center;background-color: #e9e9e9;"| General Election, November 4, 2008

References

External links
 
 
 Gard Business Group
 Eye on Lobbying - John Gard (Wisconsin Ethics Commission)
 2013–2014 2015–2016 2017–2018 2019–2020 2021–2022

1963 births
Living people
Politicians from Milwaukee
People from Lena, Wisconsin
University of Wisconsin–La Crosse alumni
Speakers of the Wisconsin State Assembly
Republican Party members of the Wisconsin State Assembly
21st-century American politicians